The 2018–19 Indian Super League season was the fifth season of the Indian Super League, one of the top Indian professional football leagues. It was established in 2013. The regular season began on 29 September 2018 and concluded on 17 March 2019. The league took a mid-season break for around one month from 17 December 2018 to early January 2019 due to India's participation in the 2019 AFC Asian Cup. 

Chennaiyin were the defending champions, having defeated Bengaluru in the 2018 final, however they did not qualify for the playoffs having finished the last in the regular season. Bengaluru FC won their maiden title by defeating FC Goa 1–0 in the final which was held on 17 March 2019. Bengaluru FC became the first team who won the ISL Championship as well as after topped the league stage.

Teams

Stadiums and locations

Personnel and sponsorship

Head coaching changes

Roster changes

Foreign Players

The number of foreign players allowed in the squad will be reduced from eight to seven from 2018 to 2019 season, however the maximum number of foreign players allowed on the pitch will remain same at five.

Regular season

League table

Results

Playoffs

Bracket

Semi-finals

Final

Season statistics

Scoring

Top scorers

Top Indian scorers

Hat-tricks 

Result column shows goal tally of player's team first.

Notes
4 – Player scored four goals(H) – Home team(A) – Away team

Assists

Clean sheets

Discipline

Player 

 Most yellow cards: 8
 Ahmed Jahouh (Goa)

 Most red cards: 2
 Marcelinho (Pune City)

Club 

 Most yellow cards: 50
 Pune City

 Most red cards: 3
 Pune City
 NorthEast United
 Goa
 Bengaluru

Average home attendances

Awards
Source: Indian Super League website

Hero of the Match

ISL Emerging Player of the Match

End-of-season awards

See also
 2018–19 I-League

References

External links
Official website

 
Indian Super League seasons
1
India